Morning glory is a common name for many flowering plants.

Morning glory may also refer to:

Music
(What's the Story) Morning Glory?, a 1995 album by Oasis
"Morning Glory" (Oasis song), a 1995 single from the above album
Morning Glory (singles box), a five disc gold EP consisting of the four singles from the album
"Morning Glory" (Tim Buckley song), a single by Tim Buckley from the Goodbye and Hello album
Morning Glory (Tim Buckley album), a 1994 compilation album of Tim Buckley songs
Morning Glory: The Tim Buckley Anthology, a 2001 two-disc compilation album of Tim Buckley songs
"Morning Glory" (Bonnie Pink song), 2010
Morning Glory (band), an American punk band from New York
Morning Glory, a section in the 1970 Pink Floyd song "Alan's Psychedelic Breakfast"
Morning Glory, a 1972 album by Mary Travers
"Morning Glory", a song by Gordon Lightfoot
"Morning Glory", a 1976 single by James & Bobby Purify
"Morning Glory", a 1976 song by The Wurzels
"Morning Glory", a 1982 song by Tatsuro Yamashita from the album For You
"Morning Glory", a 1988 B-side song by Enya released on A Box of Dreams
"Morning Glory", a single by Bobbie Gentry
"Morning Glory", a 1998 song by Union Jack, as featured on Northern Exposure: Expeditions
"Morning Glory", a 1994 song by Jamiroquai from The Return of the Space Cowboy
 "What's Your Story, Morning Glory?" by Mary Lou Williams

Film and television
Morning Glory (1933 film), a 1933 film starring Katharine Hepburn
Morning Glory (1993 film), a 1993 film starring Christopher Reeve
Morning Glory (2010 film), a 2010 film starring Rachel McAdams, Harrison Ford and Diane Keaton
"Morning Glory" (Eureka Seven episode), an episode of Eureka Seven in 2005
"Morning Glory", a 1999 episode of Bear in the Big Blue House
Morning Glory (pony), character who debuted in 1986 film My Little Pony: The Movie
Morning Glory (TV programme), a short-lived British Channel 4 breakfast television programme in 2006

Places
Morning Glory, Kentucky, U.S.
Morning Glory, Texas, U.S.
Morning Glory Pool, a hot spring in Yellowstone National Park
Morning Glory Arch, Grandstaff Canyon, Utah, U.S.
Morning Glory mine,  a mine in Oregon
Morning Glory Funeral Home, from the 1988 event Morning Glory Funeral Home scandal in Jacksonville, Florida, United States

Science
Morning Glory cloud, a rare meteorological phenomenon in Australia
Morning glory disc anomaly, a rare defect of the optic nerve

Other uses
Morning glory, a slang term for nocturnal penile tumescence
Morning Glory Zell-Ravenheart (1948–2014), neo-pagan poet
Morning Glories, a comic book series by Nick Spencer
MV Morning Glory, a 1993-built oil tanker
 Bell-mouth spillway

See also
Glory of the Morning (died 1830s), female chief of the Hocąk nation